Listed are the seasons of Romanian football club FCSB since 1947. Both FCSB as well as CSA Steaua București (football) claim the history to be theirs.

Seasons

References

FC Steaua București
Steaua Bucuresti